The National Covenant Party ( - Haraka al-'ahd al-waTani) is a political party in Syria. It is part of the National Progressive Front of parties which support the orientation of the ruling Ba'ath Party.

The party was originally licensed as the Arab Socialist Party in 1951, Syrian political activist, Akram Hourani, was the party's Secretary General. The party was a founding member of the National Progressive Front in 1972. In 2004 the party changed its name to the National Covenant Party.

The party believes in Arab nationalism, the objective of the party is to promote Syrian national unity and social peace on democratic foundations based on political, economic and social pluralism and participation of all in decision-making.

Parliamentary elections

References

Arab nationalism in Syria
Arab socialist political parties
Nationalist parties in Syria
Political parties in Syria
Political parties with year of establishment missing
Socialist parties in Syria